Tanya Gandy (born August 20, 1987 in San Diego, California), played water polo for UCLA on four of the five-consecutive NCAA National Champion Women's Water Polo teams and was named to the All-Tournament first team. She attended Rancho Bernardo High School.

In June, 2009, Gandy was named to the USA Water Polo Women’s Senior National Team for the 2009 FINA World Championships.

College career

Gandy, who wears #10 cap, is an attacker on the UCLA team. She and her senior teammates have never lost a championship tournament match. In her senior year, Gandy scored 79 goals, the highest single-season goal total in program history (eclipsing Coralie Simmons' 74-goal total from 1998). She scored 5 goals against San Jose State on March 14, 2009.

During the 2008 season, Gandy had 47 goals and 40 assists.

Honors
Gandy earned NCAA Tournament most valuable player honor when she scored three goals in the 2009 tournament game against USC. She is one of three finalist for the female Peter J. Cutino Award, the highest honor for a college water polo player.

She was also named NCAA Division I Player of the Year and first-team All-America accolades by the Association of Collegiate Water Polo Coaches (ACWPC) in 2009.

In high school, she was All-CIF and All-League Player of the Year.

See also
 List of world champions in women's water polo
 List of World Aquatics Championships medalists in water polo

References

External links
 

1987 births
Living people
American female water polo players
Sportspeople from San Diego
UCLA Bruins women's water polo players
World Aquatics Championships medalists in water polo